Leo Salminen, known professionally as Leo Jupiter, is a Finnish record producer, DJ and video artist. He is known for his multi-platinum certified productions for artists such as Reino Nordin and Teflon Brothers.

Career as a record producer 
Leo Salminen has worked with a vast group of international artists such as Laidback Luke, Wyclef Jean and LLuHan. In 2016, Salminen signed a publishing deal with the Finnish publisher Elements Music. Since then, Leo has found success in the Finnish market, by producing multi-platinum certified records such as "Hubba Bubba" by Teflon Brothers and Reino Nordin's "Antaudun", which reached number one position in Finland in 2017 in terms of airplay and streams. In addition, Leo has worked with numerous notable Finnish artists such as Kasmir, Elastinen, Robin and Alex Mattson.

Early years as a DJ 
Leo's music career started back in 2011 as an active member of the Finnish DJ community. Leo later joined the Heavyweight DJ's collective that contributed to bringing EDM culture to the Finnish mainstream. After touring Finland for a few years, Leo's producer career caught wind as he was signed to Laidback Luke's Next Era publishing in 2013. Leo also DJ'd for a Finnish pop artist Kasmir, but eventually started to concentrate in producing records.

Miscellaneous 
Leo is also a video artist and has created visuals for other Finnish musicians like Pyhimys. Moreover, he also plays the piano as his main instrument.

Discography

Songwriting and production credits

References 

Finnish record producers
Finnish DJs
Finnish video artists
Living people
Finnish songwriters
Year of birth missing (living people)
21st-century Finnish male artists
21st-century Finnish male musicians